Krivogaštani Municipality is a municipality in the western part of North Macedonia. Krivogaštani is also the name of the village where the municipal seat is found. This municipality is part of the Pelagonia Statistical Region.

Geography
The municipality borders Kruševo Municipality to the west, Dolneni Municipality to the north, Prilep Municipality to the east, and Mogila Municipality to the south.

Demographics
According to the last national census from 2021, the municipality has 5,167 inhabitants.

Ethnic groups in the municipality include:

Inhabited places

The main village of Krivogaštani is located along the main route from Prilep to Kruševo.

Other villages within this municipality include Bela Crkva, Borotino, Godivje, Korenica, Krivogaštani, Krušeani, Obršani, Pašino Ruvci, Podvis, Slavej, Vogjani, and Vrbjani

References

External links
Official website

 
Pelagonia Statistical Region
Municipalities of North Macedonia